A Classic Case of Cause and Effect is the second album by English rock band Laruso, released in May 2009 on Autonomy Recordings. Laruso toured with Fightstar during April and May 2009, to promote the album, generating a lot of new fans throughout the tour. The final track of the album, cause and effect, has a hidden instrumental which plays at 16:26.

Track list

References

2009 albums
Laruso albums